The Men's 4 × 200 metre freestyle relay competition at the 2022 World Aquatics Championships was held on 23 June 2022.

Records
Prior to the competition, the existing world and championship records were as follows.

Results

Heats
The heats started at 10:13.

Final
The final started at 19:37.

References

Men's 4 x 200 metre freestyle relay